This is a complete list of all people who previously served in the United States Senate. , a total of 2,002 different persons have served in the Senate (including those currently serving).

In the party affiliation column, if a senator switched parties and served non-consecutive terms, their affiliation for each term is listed on the corresponding line. If one of these senators also served multiple non-consecutive terms with the same party, a quotation mark indicates that their affiliation did not change between that term and their preceding term.

Classes

Number of years/terms senators have served
 6 years – 1 term
 12 years – 2 terms 
 18 years – 3 terms
 24 years – 4 terms 
 30 years – 5 terms 
 36 years – 6 terms
 42 years – 7 terms
 48 years – 8 terms 
 54 years – 9 terms

See also
Classes of United States senators
Seniority in the United States Senate

References

External links
Biographical Directory of the U.S. Congress
Senators of the United States 1789 to present
Databases of U.S. and Confederate Senators

Former